The Social Democratic Party (PSD) is a liberal-conservative political party in Portugal. Commonly known by its colloquial initials PSD, on ballot papers its initials appear as its official form PPD/PSD, with the first three letters coming from the party's original name, the Democratic People's Party (PPD). A party of the centre-right, the PSD is one of the two major parties in Portuguese politics, its rival being the Socialist Party (PS) on the centre-left.

The PSD was founded in 1974, two weeks after the Carnation Revolution and in 1976 adopted its current name. In 1979, the PSD allied with centre-right parties to form the Democratic Alliance and won that year's election. After the 1983 general election, the party formed a grand coalition with the Socialist Party, known as the Central Bloc, before winning the 1985 general election under new leader Aníbal Cavaco Silva, who shifted the party to the right. Cavaco Silva served as Prime Minister for ten years, instituting major economic liberalisation and winning two landslide victories. After he stepped down, the PSD lost the 1995 election. The party was returned to power under José Manuel Durão Barroso in 2002, but was defeated in the 2005 election. The party was able to return to power after the 2011 elections and four years later was able to win a plurality in the 2015 legislative election, winning 107 seats in the Assembly of the Republic in alliance with the CDS – People's Party, but being unable to form a minority government. The current leader, Luís Montenegro was elected on 28 May 2022.

Originally a social-democratic party, the PSD became the main centre-right, conservative party in Portugal. The PSD is a member of the European People's Party and the Centrist Democrat International. Until 1996, the PSD belonged to the European Liberal Democrat and Reform Party and Liberal International. The party publishes the weekly Povo Livre (Free People) newspaper.

History

Foundation 

The Social Democratic Party was born on 6 May 1974, when Francisco Sá Carneiro, Francisco Pinto Balsemão and Joaquim Magalhães Mota publicly announced the formation of what was then called the PPD, the Democratic People's Party. On 15 May, the party's first headquarters were inaugurated in Largo do Rato, Lisbon. This was followed, on 24 June, by the formation of the first Political Committee, consisting of Francisco Sá Carneiro, Francisco Pinto Balsemão, Joaquim Magalhães Mota, Barbosa de Melo, Mota Pinto, Montalvão Machado, Miguel Veiga, Ferreira Júnior, António Carlos Lima, António Salazar Silva, Jorge Correia da Cunha, Jorge Figueiredo Dias and Jorge Sá Borges.

The  publication was founded, its first issue being published on 13 July 1974, led by its first two directors, Manuel Alegria and Rui Machete.

On 17 January 1975, 6300 signatures were sent to the Supreme Court so that the party could be approved as a legitimate political entity, which happened a mere eight days later.

In 1975, the PPD applied unsuccessfully to join the Socialist International, with its membership attempt vetoed by the Socialist Party.

Alberto João Jardim was the co-founder of the Madeiran branch of the PSD, and governed the autonomous archipelago for decades, running as a member of the party.

Democratic Alliance governments 
The Social Democratic Party participated in a number of coalition governments in Portugal between 1974 and 1976, following the Carnation Revolution. This is seen as a transitional period in Portuguese politics, in which political institutions were built and took time to stabilize. In 1979, the PSD formed an electoral alliance, known as the Democratic Alliance (AD), with the Democratic and Social Centre (now called the People's Party, CDS-PP) and a couple of smaller right-wing parties. The AD won the parliamentary elections towards the end of 1979, and the PSD leader, Francisco Sá Carneiro, became Prime Minister. The PSD would be part of all governments until 1995. The AD increased its parliamentary majority in new elections called for 1980, but was devastated by the death of Sá Caneiro in an air crash on 4 December 1980. Francisco Pinto Balsemão took over the leadership of both the Social Democratic Party and the Democratic Alliance, as well as the Prime Ministership, but lacking Sá Carneiro's charisma, he was unable to rally popular support.

The Democratic Alliance was dissolved in 1983, and in parliamentary elections that year, the PSD lost to the Socialist Party (PS). Falling short of a majority, however, the Socialists formed a grand coalition, known as the Central Bloc, with the PSD. Many right-wingers in the PSD, including Aníbal Cavaco Silva, opposed participation in the PS-led government, and so, when Cavaco Silva was elected leader of the party on 2 June 1985, the coalition was doomed.

Cavaco Silva governments (1985–1995) 
The PSD won a plurality (but not a majority) in the general election of 1985, and Cavaco Silva became Prime Minister. Economic liberalization and tax cuts ushered in several years of economic growth. After a motion of no confidence was approved, early elections were called for July 1987, which resulted in a landslide victory for the PSD, who captured 50.2 percent of the popular vote and 148 of the 250 parliamentary seats – the first time that any political party in Portugal had mustered an absolute majority in a free election. While the PSD had been very popular going into the election, the size of its victory far exceeded the party's most optimistic projections. A strong economy, growing above 7% in 1988, ushered a big convergence between Portugal and other EU countries. 

The PSD won a historic third term in the 1991 election, with a slightly higher vote share than four years earlier. However, continuing high levels of unemployment and a lower economy, after 1993, eroded the popularity of the Cavaco Silva government.

Post-Cavaco Silva 
Cavaco Silva stepped down as leader in January 1995. In the following month, in the PSD congress, the party elected Fernando Nogueira as leader. The PSD lost the 1995 election to the PS. In 1996, Cavaco Silva ran for the presidency of the republic, but he failed to defeat former Lisbon Mayor Jorge Sampaio. Sampaio won 53.9% to Cavaco's 46.1%. The party, for the first time in 16 years, was out of government. The party was again defeated in the 1999 elections. The party, however, made a big comeback in the 2001 local elections by winning several cities, like Lisbon, Porto and Sintra, from the PS and, some, against all odds and predictions. This PSD result led the then Prime Minister António Guterres (PS) to resign and the country was led to snap general elections on March 2002.

First PSD/CDS coalition government (2002-2005) 
The PSD made a comeback in 2002 by defeating the PS by 40% to 38% margin, however, despite falling short of a majority, the PSD won enough seats to form a coalition with the CDS-PP, and the PSD leader, José Manuel Durão Barroso, became Prime Minister. Durão Barroso later resigned his post to become President of the European Commission, leaving the way for Pedro Santana Lopes, a man with whom he was frequently at odds, to become leader of the party and Prime Minister.

Back in opposition (2005–2011) 
In the parliamentary election held on 20 February 2005, Santana Lopes led the PSD to its worst defeat since 1983. With a negative swing of more than 12% percent, the party won only 75 seats, a loss of 30. The rival Socialist Party had won an absolute majority, and remained in government after the 2009 parliamentary election, albeit without an absolute majority, leaving the PSD in opposition.

The PSD-supported candidate Aníbal Cavaco Silva won the Portuguese presidential elections in 2006 and again in 2011. After the 2005 elections, Luís Marques Mendes was elected leader of the party. Internal infighting weakened Marques Mendes and, in September 2007, Marques Mendes was defeated by Luís Filipe Menezes by a 54% to 42% margin. Menezes was also incapable of dealing with his internal opposition and, after just six months in the job, Menezes resigned. On 31 May 2008, Manuela Ferreira Leite became the first female leader of a Portuguese major party. She won 38% of the votes, against the 31% of Pedro Passos Coelho and the 30% of Pedro Santana Lopes.

In the European Parliament election held on 7 June 2009, the PSD defeated the governing socialists, capturing 31.7% of the popular vote and electing eight MEPs, while the Socialist Party only won 26.5% of the popular vote and elected seven MEPs.

Although this was expected to be a "redrawing of the electoral map", the PSD has still defeated later that year, though the PS lost its majority. Pedro Passos Coelho was elected leader in March 2010, with 61% of the votes.

Second PSD/CDS coalition government (2011-2015) 
Growing popular disenchantment with the government's handling of the economic crisis coupled with the government's inability to secure the support of other parties to implement the necessary reforms to address the crisis, forced the Socialist Party Prime Minister José Sócrates to resign, leading to a fresh election on 5 June 2011. This resulted in a non-absolute majority for the PSD, leading to a coalition government with the CDS-PP, which served a full term until the 2015 general election. During this term, many austerity policies were put into practice to reduce the budget deficit but, ultimately, created unemployment and a recession that lasted until mid 2013. Since that date, the economy recovered starting to grow between 1 and 2% per trimester.

In the 2015 general election, the PSD and CDS-PP ran in a joint coalition, called Portugal Ahead, led by Pedro Passos Coelho and Paulo Portas. The coalition won the elections by a wide margin over the Socialists, capturing 38.6% of the votes while the Socialists captured only 32%, although the coalition lost 25 MPs and a more than 11% of the votes, thus falling well short of an absolute majority. The PSD/CDS-PP coalition was asked by the then President of the Republic, Aníbal Cavaco Silva, to form a government with Passos Coelho as Prime Minister.

Back in opposition (2015–present) 

The 2nd PSD/CDS government was duly formed and took the oath of office on 30 October 2015, but fell after a no-confidence motion was approved two weeks later. Its 11 days of rule make it the shortest-lived government since Portugal has been a democracy holding free elections. After that, the PSD returned to the opposition benches, and the Socialist Party was able to form an agreement with BE and CDU to support a PS minority government led by António Costa. Pedro Passos Coelho continued as party leader, but a weak opposition strategy led to bad polling numbers for the PSD. All of this culminated with the results of the 2017 local elections. In these elections, the PSD achieved their worst results ever, winning just 98 mayors and 30% of the votes. Passos Coelho announced he would not run for another term as PSD leader. On 13 January 2018, Rui Rio defeated Pedro Santana Lopes by a 54% to 46% margin and became the new party leader.

In order to avoid bankruptcy due to mounting debt, in 2017, the party, alongside the Portuguese Socialist Party, the Portuguese Communist Party, BE and the ecologist party PEV, voted in favour of abolishing party fundraising limits, thereby opening all portuguese parties to private political donorship, that they are not obligated to disclose. The new proposal was reluctantly approved by the Portuguese president Marcelo Rebelo de Sousa. 

During his first year in the leadership, Rio faced big internal opposition and, in January 2019, Rio won a motion of confidence presented by Luís Montenegro. In the EP 2019 elections, the PSD achieved their worst result ever in a national election, winning just 22% of the votes. However, the party recovered a lot of ground in the October 2019 general elections, achieving 28% of the votes, against the 36% of the PS. Nonetheless, Rio's leadership was, once again, challenged and he faced, in a two round leadership contest in January 2020, Luís Montenegro and Miguel Pinto Luz. Rio won the 1st round with 49% of the votes and defeated Luís Montenegro in the 2nd round by 53% to 47% margin, thus being re-elected as party leader.

In the Azores 2020 regional elections, the PSD was able to return to power, after 24 years in opposition, by forging a controversial deal with CHEGA, plus CDS, PPM and IL. The PSD won almost 34% of the votes, while the PS fell more than 7 pp, compared with 2016, to 39%, an unexpected result, and overall the right wing parties had a 1 seat majority over all the left. After 2020, the PSD controls the governments of Portugal's only two autonomous regions.

The 2021 local elections were quite positive for the PSD, despite not winning the most mayors in the country as a whole. The party, and its led-coalitions, won a combined 32% of the votes and were able to win, from the PS, several cities like Coimbra, Funchal and Barcelos. The main gain of the PSD was the victory in Lisbon, where Carlos Moedas defeated, against all odds and predictions, the PS incumbent mayor Fernando Medina. In October 2021, disagreements between the PS and BE-CDU led to the rejection of the 2022 budget and the calling of a snap general election for 30 January 2022. Despite a close race predicted by polls, the PSD suffered a big setback by winning just 29% of the votes and seeing the PS gaining a surprise absolute majority, with 41% of the votes. After the election, PSD leader Rui Rio opened the process to elect a new party leader. On 28 May 2022, Luís Montenegro was elected party leader by a landslide, gathering more than 72% of the votes.

Ideology

Historical evolution 

The party was founded based on classical social democracy and was a centre to centre-left party, but later it evolved into catch-all centre-right party. The party has been described as liberal-conservative, conservative, or conservative-liberal, with Christian democratic, liberal and economically liberal elements.

Factions 

The PSD is frequently referred to as a party that is not ideology-based, but rather a power party. It frequently adopts a functional big tent party strategy to win elections. Due to this strategy, which most trace to Cavaco Silva's leadership, the party is made up of many factions, mostly centre-right (including liberal democrats, Christian democrats and neoconservatives) as well as quasi-social-democrats and former communists:
Portuguese social democrats: the main faction when the party was created, throughout the party's history rightist politicians joined them to have a greater chance of gaining power and influencing the country's politics (see liberals, conservatives, right-wing populists and neoliberals). They do not follow traditional social democracy, but Portuguese social democracy as defined by Francisco Sá Carneiro's actions and writings, which includes a degree of centrist and leftist populism. They followed a kind of anti-class struggle party/cross-class party strategy. All the other members of the party claim to follow this line. Among its representatives were most of the leaders between Francisco Sá Carneiro and Cavaco Silva, Alberto João Jardim (also a founding member and an anti-neoliberal) and to an extent Luís Filipe Menezes (who called the PSD the "moderate left party") identified himself with a centre-left matrix and a united left strategy and defended a more open party on issues like abortion. José Mendes Bota is another left-wing populist.
European-style social-democrats: follow traditional social democracy. They share with the Portuguese social democrats their presence at the creation of the party and "a non-Marxist progressivist line". Some took part in the Democratic Renovator Party. A later example of a European-style Social democrat leaving the party for the Socialists is activist and politician Helena Roseta. The ones still in the party adapted to its current right-wing outlook or Portuguese social democracy. They today include former communists-turned centre-leftists, like Zita Seabra. Durão Barroso might have moved from Thatcherism to social democracy. Ironically, both Social Democrat factions were represented in the 2008 party elections by Manuela Ferreira Leite, economically neoliberal and socially conservative (often compared to Thatcher).
Agrarianism: the other main faction at creation. The PSD was always more successful in the Northern and rural areas of the country. When Sousa Franco and his SPD-inspired social democrats started their break with the rest of the party he referred to a division between "a rural wing, led by Sá Carneiro, and an urban wing, more moderate and truly social democratic, close to the positions of Helmut Schmidt" Due to the electoral influence of ruralism on the PSD's politics they may be seen inside of or influencing most factions.

Liberals (classical and social): due to the Salazarist connotation of the term right-wing and all terms connected (liberal and conservative) after the Carnation Revolution, the little attractiveness of economic liberalism in European politics, no specific liberal or conservative party was formed in post-1974 Portugal, except the experiences of the Catholic Action-monarchist Liberal Party in 1974 and the centrist liberal Democratic Renovator Party, so they started working inside the PSD. This strategy of joining "socialism and liberalism under the same hat" was especially successful during Cavaco Silva's leadership, when the party gave up its candidacy to the Socialist International and became member of the Liberal International and European Liberal Democrat and Reform Party and Liberal and Democratic Reformist Group, leaving the international and the European party and group in 1996 to join the Christian Democrat International (today Centrist Democrat International), the European People's Party and the European People's Party-European Democrats. Since then, the liberal-social democrat rift (or even the liberal-conservative-populist-social democrat rift) has plagued the party's cohesion and actions. Durão Barroso (a former revolutionary Maoist who switched sides in the 1980s) is sometimes referred to as the most pure liberal of the party. In terms of social liberals, some try to link both social democracy and social liberalism to the PSD, to refer to the early PSD as liberal or partly social liberal party and social liberalism is sometimes identified with the social market economy tradition the party traditionally supported. Even members of the Portuguese Social Liberal Movement admit the traditional and current presence of social liberals (and other liberals) on the PSD.
Christian democrats and social Christians: some claim the PSD as the party from Christian democracy and social Christianity from the beginning, or having these currents as part of its legacy. Marcelo Rebelo de Sousa is one of the main preachers of Social Christianity inside the PSD. As is Paulo Rangel.
Right-wing populists: distinct from radical right-wing populists, the populist centre and centre-left social democrats (like João Jardim and Sá Carneiro), the populist overlappers (like Cavaco Silva), and the Eurosceptic populists of the Democratic and Social Centre–People's Party (CDS-PP). They are social-economic liberal conservative/conservative liberal and moderate culturally religious conservatives and internationalist national conservatives. Their main representative is Pedro Santana Lopes. Though the main right-wing populists were present at the founding of the party (like Santana Lopes), they were clearly right-wing, recruited when their abilities were noticed in educated circles and universities, with minor agreements with Sá Carneiro's philosophy. Frequently as the PSD is a bipartisanship party, right-wing populists from the CDS-PP join the party. Luís Filipe Meneses is frequently described as a populist but he tried to lead the party back to a left line, and does not identify or act like the liberal conservative/conservative liberal populists.
Conservatives: with the post-revolutionary opposition to the right (see above in liberal) no specific conservative party was founded in Portugal; conservatives acted inside the CDS-PP and the PSD. Frequently linked with the neoliberals, pure conservatives are rare in the party as the usual partisan or politician of the party is economically moderate, but socially conservative. One of the rare exceptions of a pure conservative in this party was former party member and MP Vasco Pulido Valente, who is highly elitist and a cultural purist (unlike most of the party's partisans, who have various degrees of populism or meritocracy), highly conservative and traditionalist.
Neoconservatives: mostly former communists and leftists who supported the policies of the Bush Administration and defend similar views in Portuguese politics. The main example is José Pacheco Pereira (though his support of the Bush doctrine on the invasion of Iraq is sometimes challenged. They are frequently referred to as "Cavaco-ists" due to their support of cavacoism's legacy and candidates representative of it, like Cavaco Silva himself and Ferreira Leite, defending the position that they should take a hard stance on the left and its social liberalism).
Neoliberals: neoliberal tendencies were introduced in Portuguese economy by Cavaco Silva, removing socialism from the constitution and finishing the de-collectivization of the economy started with Sá Carneiro. Cavaco (a self-described neo-Keynesian) never employed a totally Reaganite or Thatcherite strategy, maintaining a social democrat matrix and many (right and left-wing) populist and neo-Keynesian policies. Alberto João Jardim described the inconsistent neoliberalism of the PSD as "those Chicago Boys have some funny ideas, but when election time arrives the old Keynesianism is still what counts". Cavaco Silva and Durão Barroso are both sometimes referred to as the closest to neo-liberal leaders of the party. The main pure representative of the streak is Manuela Ferreira Leite, but even she called herself a social democrat and explained "I'm not certainly liberal, I'm also not populist" and lead the social democratic factions during internal party rifts, though she accepts the nickname "Portuguese iron lady" and comparisons to Thatcher if "[it] means [...] an enormous intransigence on values and in principles, of not abdicating from these values and from these principles and of continuing my way independently of the popularity of my actions and the effects on my image".
Overlappers: the average PSD voter and partisan since Cavaco Silva's leadership. Cavaco himself, though a self-described Neo-Keynesian, an early member of the party since its centre-left days and a man with social-liberal and centrist populist economic policy tendencies, he is personally a social conservative (opposing same-sex marriage and abortion) and a practicing Catholic. As such, Cavacoism should be considered a "hybrid" or a political syncretism. A similar case is Vasco Graça Moura, who claims to be an economic social democrat but opposes gay people serving in the military and is a self-described "centre-left reactionary". The overlappers are mainly represented in the forums gathered by the District of Oporto section of the party, which during the 2009 European elections tried to gather the ideas of all factions.
Centrists: not to be confused with overlappers. Still indecisive between (traditional or Portuguese) social democracy, social liberalism or any other kind of centrism.
Transversalists: are pragmatic and not strict on ideological issues. Although open to privatization and civil society alternatives to the social state, in speech they move closer to the centre-left origins of the party and are generally proud of them. The main representative of this faction is Pedro Passos Coelho, who claims to be neither left nor right, but that "the real issues are between old and new", though his opponents identified him as a liberal (in the conservative-liberal or neoliberal European sense) since the 2008 party election, though he recalled the many meanings of liberal and recalled the left liberalism of the United States Democratic Party, being even called "PSD's Obama" by supporters. Centrists and transversalists inside the party share the think tank  (Building Ideas), which Passos Coelho founded and leads. They mix (like the closely allied centrists) calls to privatization with others to more social justice, government regulation and arbitration and strategic governmental involvement in the economy. This faction is in constant rift with the more socially right-wing ones (who have been leading the party for a long time) and also with the overlappers whose hybrid approach they refuse, over the future of the party and its future ideological and philosophical alignments.

Election results

Assembly of the Republic
Seat share in the Portuguese legislative elections

European Parliament

Regional Assemblies

Party leaders

List of leaders

Graphical timeline

List of Secretaries-General (second-in-command) 
Joaquim Magalhães Mota (31 October 1976 – 29 January 1978; as President)
Sérvulo Correia (29 January 1978 – 2 July 1978; as President)
Amândio de Azevedo (2 July 1978 – 17 June 1979; as President)
António D'Orey Capucho (17 June 1979 – 25 March 1984; as President until 27 February 1983)
Francisco Antunes da Silva (25 March 1984 – 19 May 1985)
Manuel Dias Loureiro (19 May 1985 – 8 April 1990)
José Falcão e Cunha (8 April 1990 – 15 November 1992)
José Nunes Liberato (15 November 1992 – 19 February 1995)
Eduardo Azevedo Soares (19 February 1995 – 31 March 1996)
Rui Rio (31 March 1996 – 20 June 1997)
Carlos Horta e Costa (20 June 1997 – 19 April 1998)
António D'Orey Capucho (19 April 1998 – 17 January 1999)
Artur Torres Pereira (17 January 1999 – 2 May 1999)
José Luís Arnaut (2 May 1999 – 23 May 2004)
Miguel Relvas (23 May 2004 – 10 April 2005)
Miguel Macedo (10 April 2005 – 14 October 2007)
José Ribau Esteves (14 October 2007 – 22 June 2008)
Luís Marques Guedes (22 June 2008 – 11 October 2010)
Miguel Relvas (11 April 2010 – 12 June 2011)
José Matos Rosa (12 June 2011 – 18 February 2018)
Feliciano Barreiras Duarte (18 February 2018 – 19 March 2018)
José Silvano (19 March 2018 – 3 July 2022)
Hugo Soares (3 July 2022 – present)
Source:

Prime Ministers 
Francisco Sá Carneiro: 1979–1980
Francisco Pinto Balsemão: 1981–1983
Aníbal Cavaco Silva: 1985–1995
José Manuel Durão Barroso: 2002–2004
Pedro Santana Lopes: 2004–2005
Pedro Passos Coelho: 2011–2015

Presidents of the Republic 
Aníbal Cavaco Silva: 2006–2016
Marcelo Rebelo de Sousa: 2016–present

See also 
Politics of Portugal
List of political parties in Portugal

Notes

References

External links 

Social Democratic Party – official website 
Social Democratic Youth – official website 
Social Democratic Workers – official website 

 
1974 establishments in Portugal
Conservative parties in Portugal
Liberal conservative parties
Liberal parties in Portugal
Member parties of the European People's Party
Organisations based in Lisbon
Political parties established in 1974
Political parties in Portugal